A Soul for Sale is a 1918 American silent drama film directed by Allen Holubar and starring Dorothy Phillips, Katherine Kirkwood and Alan Roscoe. Prints and/or fragments were found in the Dawson Film Find in 1978.

Cast
 Dorothy Phillips as Neila Pendleton
 Katherine Kirkwood as Mrs. Pendleton
 Alan Roscoe as Steele Minturn
 William Burgess as Hale Faxon
 Harry Dunkinson as Wilbur Simons
Joseph W. Girard as Garet Pendleton

References

Bibliography
 Clive Hirschhorn. The Universal Story. Crown, 1983.

External links
 

1918 films
1918 drama films
1910s English-language films
American silent feature films
Silent American drama films
American black-and-white films
Universal Pictures films
Films directed by Allen Holubar
1910s American films
English-language drama films